The E48 particulate bomb was a U.S. biological sub-munition designed during the 1950s for use with the E96 cluster bomb.

History
In February 1950 a U.S. Army report prepared by William Creasy, a colonel within the U.S. bio-weapons program, noted that the E48 particulate bomb was in its final stages of development. Creasy also reported that the E48 had been successfully tested in three field trials.

Specifications
The E48 particulate bomb was a  sub-munition meant to be clustered in the E38 type cluster adapter, together the E48 and E38 constituted the E96 cluster bomb. Some of the agents considered for use with the E48 included, B. suis, anthrax, and botulin.

Tests involving the E48
The E48 sub-munition was utilized in tests at Dugway Proving Ground in July and August 1950. The July tests released Bacillus globigii from the E48 using air-dropped cluster bombs. The August tests utilized the bacteria Serratia marcescens, and involved E48s which dispersed the agent statically, from the ground.

References

Biological weapon delivery systems
Submunitions
Cold War aerial bombs of the United States